Yemen, officially the Republic of Yemen, is a country in Western Asia. It is situated on the southern end of the Arabian Peninsula, and borders Saudi Arabia to the north and Oman to the northeast and shares maritime borders with Eritrea, Djibouti, and Somalia. Its constitutionally stated capital, and largest city, is Sanaa. As of 2021, Yemen has an estimated population of 30.4 million.

In ancient times, Yemen was the home of the Sabaeans, a trading state that included parts of modern-day Ethiopia and Eritrea. Later in 275 AD, the Himyarite Kingdom was influenced by Judaism. Christianity arrived in the fourth century. Islam spread quickly in the seventh century and Yemenite troops were crucial in the early Islamic conquests. Several dynasties emerged in the 9th to 16th centuries, such as the Rasulid dynasty. The country was divided between the Ottoman and British empires in the 1800s. The Zaydi Mutawakkilite Kingdom of Yemen was established after World War I before the creation of the Yemen Arab Republic in 1962. South Yemen remained a British protectorate as the Aden Protectorate until 1967 when it became an independent state and later, a Marxist-Leninist state. The two Yemeni states united to form the modern Republic of Yemen (al-Jumhūrīyah al-Yamanīyah) in 1990. President Ali Abdullah Saleh was the first president of the new republic until his resignation in 2012 in the wake of the Arab Spring.

Since 2011, Yemen has been in a state of political crisis starting with street protests against poverty, unemployment, corruption, and president Saleh's plan to amend Yemen's constitution and eliminate the presidential term limit. President Saleh stepped down and the powers of the presidency were transferred to Abdrabbuh Mansur Hadi. Since then, the country has been in a civil war (alongside the Saudi Arabian-led military intervention aimed at restoring Hadi's government against Iran-backed Houthi rebels) with several proto-state entities claiming to govern Yemen: the government of President Hadi which became the Presidential Leadership Council in 2022, the Houthi movement's Supreme Political Council, and the separatist Southern Movement's Southern Transitional Council. At least 56,000 civilians and combatants have been killed in armed violence in Yemen since January 2016. The war has resulted in a famine affecting 17 million people. The lack of safe drinking water, caused by depleted aquifers and the destruction of the country's water infrastructure, has also caused the largest, fastest-spreading cholera outbreak in modern history, with the number of suspected cases exceeding 994,751. Over 2,226 people have died since the outbreak began to spread rapidly at the end of April 2017. The ongoing humanitarian crisis and conflict has received widespread criticism for having a dramatic worsening effect on Yemen's humanitarian situation, that some say has reached the level of a "humanitarian disaster" and some have even labelled it as a genocide. It has worsened the country's already-poor human rights situation.

Yemen is a member of the Arab League, the United Nations, the Non-Aligned Movement and the Organisation of Islamic Cooperation. It belongs to the least developed country group, referring to its numerous "severe structural impediments to sustainable development", and has been the poorest country in the MENA region in recent history. In 2019, the United Nations reported that Yemen is the country with the most people in need of humanitarian aid, about 24 million people, or 85% of its population. As of 2020, the country is placed the highest in the Fragile State Index, the second worst in the Global Hunger Index, surpassed only by the Central African Republic, and has the lowest Human Development Index out of all non-African countries.

Etymology 

The term Yamnat was mentioned in Old South Arabian inscriptions on the title of one of the kings of the second Himyarite kingdom known as Shammar Yahrʽish II. The term probably referred to the southwestern coastline of the Arabian peninsula and the southern coastline between Aden and Hadramout. The historical Yemen included much greater territory than the current nation, stretching from northern 'Asir in southwestern Saudi Arabia to Dhofar in southern Oman.

One etymology derives Yemen from ymnt, meaning "South", and significantly plays on the notion of the land to the right (𐩺𐩣𐩬).

Other sources claim that Yemen is related to yamn or yumn, meaning "felicity" or "blessed", as much of the country is fertile. The Romans called it Arabia Felix ("happy" or "fortunate" Arabia"), as opposed to Arabia Deserta ("deserted Arabia").
Latin and Greek writers referred to ancient Yemen as "India", which arose from the Persians calling the Abyssinians whom they came into contact with in South Arabia by the name of the dark-skinned people who lived next to them, viz. the Indians.

History 

Yemen has existed at the crossroads of civilisations for more than 3,000 years. The country was home to figures such as the Queen of Sheba who brought a caravan of gifts for King Solomon. For centuries, it became a primary producer of coffee exported in the port of Mocha. The Ancient Romans called this area Arabia Felix or Happy Arabia.

Ancient history 

With its long sea border between eastern and western civilizations, Yemen has long existed at a crossroads of cultures with a strategic location in terms of trade on the west of the Arabian Peninsula. Large settlements for their era existed in the mountains of northern Yemen as early as 5000 BC.

The Sabaean Kingdom came into existence in at least the 12th century BC. The four major kingdoms or tribal confederations in South Arabia were Saba, Hadramout, Qataban, and Ma'in. Sabaʾ is thought to be biblical Sheba and was the most prominent federation. The Sabaean rulers adopted the title Mukarrib generally thought to mean unifier, or a priest-king, or the head of the confederation of South Arabian kingdoms, the "king of the kings". The role of the Mukarrib was to bring the various tribes under the kingdom and preside over them all. The Sabaeans built the Great Dam of Marib around 940 BC. The dam was built to withstand the seasonal flash floods surging down the valley.

Between 700 and 680 BC, the Kingdom of Awsan dominated Aden and its surroundings and challenged the Sabaean supremacy in the Arabian South. Sabaean Mukarrib Karib'il Watar I conquered the entire realm of Awsan, and expanded Sabaean rule and territory to include much of South Arabia. Lack of water in the Arabian Peninsula prevented the Sabaeans from unifying the entire peninsula. Instead, they established various colonies to control trade routes.

Evidence of Sabaean influence is found in northern Ethiopia, where the South Arabian alphabet, religion and pantheon, and the South Arabian style of art and architecture were introduced. The Sabaean created a sense of identity through their religion. They worshipped El-Maqah and believed that they were his children. For centuries, the Sabaeans controlled outbound trade across the Bab-el-Mandeb, a strait separating the Arabian Peninsula from the Horn of Africa and the Red Sea from the Indian Ocean.

By the third century BC, Qataban, Hadramout, and Ma'in became independent from Saba and established themselves in the Yemeni arena. Minaean rule stretched as far as Dedan, with their capital at Baraqish. The Sabaeans regained their control over Ma'in after the collapse of Qataban in 50 BC. By the time of the Roman expedition to Arabia Felix in 25 BC, the Sabaeans were once again the dominating power in Southern Arabia. Aelius Gallus was ordered to lead a military campaign to establish Roman dominance over the Sabaeans.

The Romans had a vague and contradictory geographical knowledge about Arabia Felix or Yemen. The Roman army of 10,000 men was defeated before Marib. Strabo's close relationship with Aelius Gallus led him to attempt to justify his friend's defeat in his writings. It took the Romans six months to reach Marib and 60 days to return to Egypt. The Romans blamed their Nabataean guide and executed him for treachery. No direct mention in Sabaean inscriptions of the Roman expedition has yet been found.

After the Roman expedition – perhaps earlier – the country fell into chaos, and two clans, namely Hamdan and Himyar, claimed kingship, assuming the title King of Sheba and Dhu Raydan. Dhu Raydan, i.e., Himyarites, allied themselves with Aksum in Ethiopia against the Sabaeans. The chief of Bakil and king of Saba and Dhu Raydan, El Sharih Yahdhib, launched successful campaigns against the Himyarites and Habashat, i.e., Aksum, El Sharih took pride in his campaigns and added the title Yahdhib to his name, which means "suppressor"; he used to kill his enemies by cutting them to pieces. Sana'a came into prominence during his reign, as he built the Ghumdan Palace as his place of residence.

The Himyarite annexed Sana'a from Hamdan around 100 AD. Hashdi tribesmen rebelled against them and regained Sana'a around 180 AD. Shammar Yahri'sh had not conquered Hadramout, Najran, and Tihama until 275 AD, thus unifying Yemen and consolidating Himyarite rule. The Himyarites rejected polytheism and adhered to a consensual form of monotheism called Rahmanism.

In 354 AD, Roman Emperor Constantius II sent an embassy headed by Theophilos the Indian to convert the Himyarites to Christianity. According to Philostorgius, the mission was resisted by local Jews. Several inscriptions have been found in Hebrew and Sabaean praising the ruling house in Jewish terms for "...helping and empowering the People of Israel."

According to Islamic traditions, King As'ad the Perfect mounted a military expedition to support the Jews of Yathrib. Abu Kariba As'ad, as known from the inscriptions, led a military campaign to central Arabia or Najd to support the vassal Kingdom of Kinda against the Lakhmids. However, no direct reference to Judaism or Yathrib was discovered from his lengthy reign. Abu Kariba died in 445 AD, having reigned for almost 50 years. By 515 AD, Himyar became increasingly divided along religious lines and a bitter conflict between different factions paved the way for an Aksumite intervention. The last Himyarite king Ma'adikarib Ya'fur was supported by Aksum against his Jewish rivals. Ma'adikarib was Christian and launched a campaign against the Lakhmids in southern Iraq, with the support of other Arab allies of Byzantium. The Lakhmids were a Bulwark of Persia, which was intolerant to a proselytizing religion like Christianity.

After the death of Ma'adikarib Ya'fur around 521 AD, a Himyarite Jewish warlord named Yousef Asar Yathar rose to power with the honorary title of Yathar (meaning, "to avenge"). Yemenite Christians, aided by Aksum and Byzantium, systematically persecuted Jews and burned down several synagogues across the land. Yousef avenged his people with great cruelty. He marched toward the port city of Mocha, killing 14,000 and capturing 11,000. Then he settled a camp in Bab-el-Mandeb to prevent aid flowing from Aksum. At the same time, Yousef sent an army under the command of another Jewish warlord, Sharahil Yaqbul, to Najran. Sharahil had reinforcements from the Bedouins of the Kinda and Madh'hij tribes, eventually wiping out the Christian community in Najran.

Yousef or Dhu Nuwas (the one with sidelocks) as known in Arabic literature, believed that Christians in Yemen were a fifth column. Christian sources portray Dhu Nuwas (Yousef Asar) as a Jewish zealot, while Islamic traditions say that he threw 20,000 Christians into pits filled with flaming oil. Dhu Nuwas left two inscriptions, neither of them making any reference to fiery pits. Byzantium had to act or lose all credibility as a protector of eastern Christianity. It is reported that Byzantium Emperor Justin I sent a letter to the Aksumite King Kaleb, pressuring him to "...attack the abominable Hebrew." A tripartite military alliance of Byzantine, Aksumite, and Arab Christians successfully defeated Yousef around 525–527 AD and a client Christian king was installed on the Himyarite throne.

Esimiphaios was a local Christian lord, mentioned in an inscription celebrating the burning of an ancient Sabaean palace in Marib to build a church on its ruins. Three new churches were built in Najran alone. Many tribes did not recognize Esimiphaios's authority. Esimiphaios was displaced in 531 by a warrior named Abraha, who refused to leave Yemen and declared himself an independent king of Himyar.

Emperor Justinian I sent an embassy to Yemen. He wanted the officially Christian Himyarites to use their influence on the tribes in inner Arabia to launch military operations against Persia. Justinian I bestowed the "dignity of king" upon the Arab sheikhs of Kindah and Ghassan in central and northern Arabia. From early on, Roman and Byzantine policy was to develop close links with the powers of the coast of the Red Sea. They were successful in converting Aksum and influencing their culture. The results concerning to Yemen were rather disappointing.

A Kendite prince called Yazid bin Kabshat rebelled against Abraha and his Arab Christian allies. A truce was reached once the Great Dam of Marib had suffered a breach. Abraha died around 570 AD; Sources regarding his death are available from the Qur'an and Hadith. The Sasanid Empire annexed Aden around 570 AD. Under their rule, most of Yemen enjoyed great autonomy except for Aden and Sana'a. This era marked the collapse of ancient South Arabian civilization since the greater part of the country was under several independent clans until the arrival of Islam in 630 AD.

Middle Ages

Advent of Islam and the three dynasties 

Muhammad sent his cousin Ali to Sana'a and its surroundings around 630 AD. At the time, Yemen was the most advanced region in Arabia. The Banu Hamdan confederation was among the first to accept Islam. Muhammad sent Muadh ibn Jabal, as well to Al-Janad, in present-day Taiz, and dispatched letters to various tribal leaders. The reason behind this was the division among the tribes and the absence of a strong central authority in Yemen during the days of the prophet.

Major tribes, including Himyar, sent delegations to Medina during the "year of delegations" around 630–631 AD. Several Yemenis accepted Islam before the year 630, such as Ammar ibn Yasir, Al-Ala'a Al-Hadrami, Miqdad ibn Aswad, Abu Musa Ashaari, and Sharhabeel ibn Hasana. A man named 'Abhala ibn Ka'ab Al-Ansi expelled the remaining Persians and claimed he was a prophet of Rahman. He was assassinated by a Yemeni of Persian origin called Fayruz al-Daylami. Christians, who were mainly staying in Najran along with Jews, agreed to pay jizyah, although some Jews converted to Islam, such as Wahb ibn Munabbih and Ka'ab al-Ahbar.

Yemen was stable during the Rashidun Caliphate. Yemeni tribes played a pivotal role in the Islamic expansion of Egypt, Iraq, Persia, the Levant, Anatolia, North Africa, Sicily, and Andalusia. Yemeni tribes who settled in Syria, contributed significantly to the solidification of Umayyad rule, especially during the reign of Marwan I. Powerful Yemenite tribes such as Kinda were on his side during the Battle of Marj Rahit.

Several emirates led by people of Yemeni descent were established in North Africa and Andalusia. Effective control over entire Yemen was not achieved by the Umayyad Caliphate. Imam Abdullah ibn Yahya Al-Kindi was elected in 745 AD to lead the Ibāḍī movement in Hadramawt and Oman. He expelled the Umayyad governor from Sana'a and captured Mecca and Medina in 746. Al-Kindi, known by his nickname "Talib al-Haqq" (seeker of truth), established the first Ibadi state in the history of Islam but was killed in Taif around 749.

Muhammad ibn Abdullah ibn Ziyad founded the Ziyadid dynasty in Tihama around 818 AD. The state stretched from Haly (in present-day Saudi Arabia) to Aden. They nominally recognized the Abbasid Caliphate but were ruling independently from their capital in Zabid. The history of this dynasty is obscure. They never exercised control over the highlands and Hadramawt, and did not control more than a coastal strip of Yemen (Tihama) bordering the Red Sea. A Himyarite clan called the Yufirids established their rule over the highlands from Saada to Taiz, while Hadramawt was an Ibadi stronghold and rejected all allegiance to the Abbasids in Baghdad. By virtue of its location, the Ziyadid dynasty of Zabid developed a special relationship with Abyssinia. The chief of the Dahlak islands exported slaves, as well as amber and leopard hides, to the then ruler of Yemen.

The first Zaidi imam, Yahya ibn al-Husayn, arrived in Yemen in 893 AD. He was the founder of the Zaidi imamate in 897. He was a religious cleric and judge who was invited to come to Saada from Medina to arbitrate tribal disputes. Imam Yahya persuaded local tribesmen to follow his teachings. The sect slowly spread across the highlands, as the tribes of Hashid and Bakil, later known as "the twin wings of the imamate", accepted his authority.

Yahya established his influence in Saada and Najran. He also tried to capture Sana'a from the Yufirids in 901 AD but failed miserably. In 904, the Isma'ilis under Ibn Hawshab and Ali ibn al-Fadl al-Jayshani invaded Sana'a. The Yufirid emir As'ad ibn Ibrahim retreated to Al-Jawf, and between 904 and 913, Sana'a was conquered no less than 20 times by Isma'ilis and Yufirids. As'ad ibn Ibrahim regained Sana'a in 915. Yemen was in turmoil as Sana'a became a battlefield for the three dynasties, as well as independent tribes.

The Yufirid emir Abdullah ibn Qahtan attacked and burned Zabid in 989, severely weakening the Ziyadid dynasty. The Ziyadid monarchs lost effective power after 989, or even earlier than that. Meanwhile, a succession of slaves held power in Zabid and continued to govern in the name of their masters, eventually establishing their own dynasty around 1022 or 1050 according to different sources. Although they were recognized by the Abbasid Caliphate in Baghdad, they ruled no more than Zabid and four districts to its north. The rise of the Isma'ili Sulayhid dynasty in the Yemeni highlands reduced their history to a series of intrigues.

Sulayhid Dynasty (1047–1138) 

The Sulayhid dynasty was founded in the northern highlands around 1040; at the time, Yemen was ruled by different local dynasties. In 1060, Ali ibn Muhammad Al-Sulayhi conquered Zabid and killed its ruler Al-Najah, founder of the Najahid dynasty. His sons were forced to flee to Dahlak. Hadramawt fell into Sulayhid hands after their capture of Aden in 1162.

By 1063, Ali had subjugated Greater Yemen. He then marched toward Hejaz and occupied Makkah. Ali was married to Asma bint Shihab, who governed Yemen with her husband. The Khutba during Friday prayers was proclaimed in both her husband's name and hers. No other Arab woman had this honor since the advent of Islam.

Ali al-Sulayhi was killed by Najah's sons on his way to Mecca in 1084. His son Ahmed Al-Mukarram led an army to Zabid and killed 8,000 of its inhabitants. He later installed the Zurayids to govern Aden. al-Mukarram, who had been afflicted with facial paralysis resulting from war injuries, retired in 1087 and handed over power to his wife Arwa al-Sulayhi. Queen Arwa moved the seat of the Sulayhid dynasty from Sana'a to Jibla, a small town in central Yemen near Ibb. Jibla was strategically near the Sulayhid dynasty source of wealth, the agricultural central highlands. It was also within easy reach of the southern portion of the country, especially Aden. She sent Ismaili missionaries to India, where a significant Ismaili community was formed that exists to this day. Queen Arwa continued to rule securely until her death in 1138.

Arwa al-Sulayhi is still remembered as a great and much-loved sovereign, as attested in Yemeni historiography, literature, and popular lore, where she is referred to as Balqis al-sughra ("the junior queen of Sheba"). Although the Sulayhids were Ismaili, they never tried to impose their beliefs on the public. Shortly after Queen Arwa's death, the country was split between five competing petty dynasties along religious lines. The Ayyubid dynasty overthrew the Fatimid Caliphate in Egypt. A few years after their rise to power, Saladin dispatched his brother Turan Shah to conquer Yemen in 1174.

Ayyubid conquest (1171–1260) 

Turan Shah conquered Zabid from the Mahdids in May 1174, then marched toward Aden in June and captured it from the Zurayids. The Hamdanid sultans of Sana'a resisted the Ayyubid in 1175, and the Ayyubids did not manage to secure Sana'a until 1189. The Ayyubid rule was stable in southern and central Yemen, where they succeeded in eliminating the ministates of that region, while Ismaili and Zaidi tribesmen continued to hold out in several fortresses.

The Ayyubids failed to capture the Zaydis stronghold in northern Yemen. In 1191, Zaydis of Shibam Kawkaban rebelled and killed 700 Ayyubid soldiers. Imam Abdullah bin Hamza proclaimed the imamate in 1197 and fought al-Mu'izz Ismail, the Ayyubid Sultan of Yemen. Imam Abdullah was defeated at first but was able to conquer Sana'a and Dhamar in 1198, and al-Mu'izz Ismail was assassinated in 1202.

Abdullah bin Hamza carried on the struggle against the Ayyubid until his death in 1217. After his demise, the Zaidi community was split between two rival imams. The Zaydis were dispersed and a truce was signed with the Ayyubid in 1219. The Ayyubid army was defeated in Dhamar in 1226. Ayyubid Sultan Mas'ud Yusuf left for Mecca in 1228, never to return. Other sources suggest that he was forced to leave for Egypt instead in 1223.

Rasulid Dynasty (1229–1454) 

The Rasulid Dynasty was established in 1229 by Umar ibn Rasul, who was appointed deputy governor by the Ayyubids in 1223. When the last Ayyubid ruler left Yemen in 1229, Umar stayed in the country as caretaker. He subsequently declared himself an independent king by assuming the title "al-Malik Al-Mansur" (the king assisted by Allah). Umar established the Rasulid dynasty on a firm foundation and expanded its territory to include the area from Dhofar to Mecca

Umar first established himself at Zabid, then moved into the mountainous interior, taking the important highland centre Sana'a. However, the Rasulid capitals were Zabid and Taiz. He was assassinated by his nephew in 1249. Omar's son Yousef defeated the faction led by his father's assassins and crushed several counter-attacks by the Zaydi imams who still held on in the northern highland. Mainly because of the victories he scored over his rivals, he assumed the honorific title "al-Muzaffar" (the victorious).

After the fall of Baghdad to the Mongols in 1258, al-Muzaffar Yusuf I appropriated the title of caliph. He chose the city of Taiz to become the political capital of the kingdom because of its strategic location and proximity to Aden. al-Muzaffar Yusuf I died in 1296, having reigned for 47 years. When the news of his death reached the Zaydi imam Al-Mutawakkil al-Mutahhar bin Yahya, he commented, 

The Rasulid state nurtured Yemen's commercial links with India and the Far East. They profited greatly by the Red Sea transit trade via Aden and Zabid. The economy also boomed due to the agricultural development programs instituted by the kings who promoted massive cultivation of palms. The Rasulid kings enjoyed the support of the population of Tihama and southern Yemen, while they had to buy the loyalty of Yemen's restive northern highland tribes.

The Rasulid sultans built numerous Madrasas to solidify the Shafi'i school of thought, which is still the dominant school of jurisprudence amongst Yemenis today. Under their rule, Taiz and Zabid became major international centres of Islamic learning. The kings themselves were educated men in their own right, who not only had important libraries but also wrote treatises on a wide array of subjects, ranging from astrology and medicine to agriculture and genealogy.

The dynasty is regarded as the greatest native Yemeni state since the fall of the pre-Islamic Himyarite Kingdom. They were of Turkic descent. They claimed an ancient Yemenite origin to justify their rule. The Rasulids were not the first dynasty to create a fictitious genealogy for political purposes, nor were they doing anything out of the ordinary in the tribal context of Arabia. By claiming descent from a solid Yemenite tribe, the Rasulids brought Yemen to a vital sense of unity in an otherwise chaotic regional milieu.

They had a difficult relationship with the Mamluks of Egypt because the latter considered them a vassal state. Their competition centred over the Hejaz and the right to provide kiswa of the Ka'aba in Mecca. The dynasty became increasingly threatened by disgruntled family members over the problem of succession, combined by periodic tribal revolts, as they were locked in a war of attrition with the Zaydi imams in the northern highlands. During the last 12 years of Rasulid rule, the country was torn between several contenders for the kingdom. The weakening of the Rasulid provided an opportunity for the Banu Taher clan to take over and establish themselves as the new rulers of Yemen in 1454 AD.

Tahiride Dynasty (1454–1517) 

The Tahirids were a local clan based in Rada'a. While they were not as impressive as their predecessors, they were still keen builders. They built schools, mosques, and irrigation channels, as well as water cisterns and bridges in Zabid, Aden, Rada'a, and Juban. Their best-known monument is the Amiriya Madrasa in Rada' District, which was built in 1504.

The Tahiride were too weak either to contain the Zaydi imams or to defend themselves against foreign attacks.

Realizing how rich the Tahiride realm was, they decided to conquer it. The Mamluk army, with the support of forces loyal to Zaydi Imam Al-Mutawakkil Yahya Sharaf ad-Din, conquered the entire realm of the Tahiride but failed to capture Aden in 1517. The Mamluk victory was short-lived. The Ottoman Empire conquered Egypt, hanging the last Mamluk Sultan in Cairo. The Ottomans had not decided to conquer Yemen until 1538. The Zaydi highland tribes emerged as national heroes by offering stiff, vigorous resistance to the Turkish occupation. The Mamluks of Egypt tried to attach Yemen to Egypt and the Portuguese led by Afonso de Albuquerque, occupied the island of Socotra and made an unsuccessful attack on Aden in 1513.

Modern history

The Zaydis and Ottomans 

The Ottomans had two fundamental interests to safeguard in Yemen: The Islamic holy cities of Mecca and Medina, and the trade route with India in spices and textiles—both threatened, and the latter virtually eclipsed, by the arrival of the Portuguese in the Indian Ocean and the Red Sea in the early 16th century. Hadım Suleiman Pasha, The Ottoman governor of Egypt, was ordered to command a fleet of 90 ships to conquer Yemen. The country was in a state of incessant anarchy and discord as Hadım Suleiman Pasha described it by saying:

Imam al-Mutawakkil Yahya Sharaf ad-Din ruled over the northern highlands including Sana'a, while Aden was held by the last Tahiride Sultan 'Amir ibn Dauod. Hadım Suleiman Pasha stormed Aden in 1538, killing its ruler, and extended Ottoman authority to include Zabid in 1539 and eventually Tihama in its entirety. Zabid became the administrative headquarters of Yemen Eyalet. The Ottoman governors did not exercise much control over the highlands. They held sway mainly in the southern coastal region, particularly around Zabid, Mocha, and Aden. Of 80,000 soldiers sent to Yemen from Egypt between 1539 and 1547, only 7,000 survived. The Ottoman accountant-general in Egypt remarked:

The Ottomans sent yet another expeditionary force to Zabid in 1547, while Imam al-Mutawakkil Yahya Sharaf ad-Din was ruling the highlands independently. Imam al-Mutawakkil Yahya chose his son Ali to succeed him, a decision that infuriated his other son al-Mutahhar ibn Yahya. Al-Mutahhar was lame, so he was not qualified for the imamate. He urged Oais Pasha, the Ottoman colonial governor in Zabid, to attack his father. Indeed, Ottoman troops supported by tribal forces loyal to Imam al-Mutahhar stormed Taiz and marched north toward Sana'a in August 1547. The Turks officially made Imam al-Mutahhar a Sanjak-bey with authority over 'Amran. Imam al-Mutahhar assassinated the Ottoman colonial governor and recaptured Sana'a, but the Ottomans, led by Özdemir Pasha, forced al-Mutahhar to retreat to his fortress in Thula. Özdemir Pasha effectively put Yemen under Ottoman rule between 1552 and 1560. He was considered a competent ruler given Yemen's notorious lawlessness, garrisoning the main cities, building new fortresses, and rendering secure the main routes. Özdemir died in Sana'a in 1561 and was succeeded by Mahmud Pasha.

Unlike Özdemir's brief but able leadership, Mahmud Pasha was described by other Ottoman officials as a corrupt and unscrupulous governor. He used his authority to take over several castles, some of which belonged to the former Rasulid kings. Mahmud Pasha killed a Sunni scholar from Ibb. The Ottoman historian claimed that this incident was celebrated by the Zaydi Shia community in the northern highlands. Disregarding the delicate balance of power in Yemen by acting tactlessly, he alienated different groups within Yemeni society, causing them to forget their rivalries and unite against the Turks. Mahmud Pasha was displaced by Ridvan Pasha in 1564. By 1565, Yemen was split into two provinces, the highlands under the command of Ridvan Pasha and Tihama under Murad Pasha. Imam al-Mutahhar launched a propaganda campaign in which he claimed that the prophet Mohammed came to him in a dream and advised him to wage jihad against the Ottomans. Al-Mutahhar led the tribes to capture Sana'a from Ridvan Pasha in 1567. When Murad tried to relieve Sana'a, highland tribesmen ambushed his unit and slaughtered all of them. Over 80 battles were fought. The last decisive encounter took place in Dhamar around 1568, in which Murad Pasha was beheaded and his head sent to al-Mutahhar in Sana'a. By 1568, only Zabid remained under the possession of the Turks.

Lala Kara Mustafa Pasha, the Ottoman governor of Syria, was ordered by Selim II to suppress the Yemeni rebels. However, the Turkish army in Egypt was reluctant to go to Yemen due to their knowledge of the hegemony of the northern Yemenis. Mustafa Pasha sent a letter with two Turkish shawishes hoping to persuade al-Mutahhar to give an apology and confirm that Mustafa Pasha did not promote any act of aggression against the Ottoman army, and state that the "ignorant Arabian" according to the Turks, acted on their own. Imam al-Mutahhar refused the Ottoman offer. When Mustafa Pasha sent an expeditionary force under the command of Uthman Pasha, it was defeated with great casualties. Sultan Selim II was infuriated by Mustafa's hesitation to go to Yemen. He executed a number of sanjak-beys in Egypt and ordered Sinan Pasha to lead the entire Turkish army in Egypt to reconquer Yemen. Sinan Pasha was a prominent Ottoman general of Albanian origin. He reconquered Aden, Taiz, and Ibb, and besieged Shibam Kawkaban in 1570 for seven months. The siege was lifted once a truce was reached. Imam al-Mutahhar was pushed back, but could not be entirely overcome. After al-Mutahhar's demise in 1572, the Zaydi community was not united under an imam; the Turks took advantage of their disunity and conquered Sana'a, Sa'dah, and Najran in 1583. Imam al-Nasir Hassan was arrested in 1585 and exiled to Constantinople, thereby putting an end to the Yemeni rebellion.

The Zaydi tribesmen in the northern highlands particularly those of Hashid and Bakil, were ever the Turkish bugbear in all Arabia. The Ottomans who justified their presence in Yemen as a triumph for Islam, accused the Zaydis of being infidels. Hassan Pasha was appointed governor of Yemen and enjoyed a period of relative peace from 1585 to 1597. Pupils of al-Mansur al-Qasim suggested he should claim the imamate and fight the Turks. He declined at first, but the promotion of the Hanafi school of jurisprudence at the expense of Zaydi Islam infuriated al-Mansur al-Qasim. He proclaimed the imamate in September 1597, which was the same year the Ottoman authorities inaugurated al-Bakiriyya Mosque. By 1608, Imam al-Mansur (the victorious) regained control over the highlands and signed a truce for 10 years with the Ottomans. Imam al-Mansur al-Qasim died in 1620. His son Al-Mu'ayyad Muhammad succeeded him and confirmed the truce with the Ottomans. In 1627, the Ottomans lost Aden and Lahej. 'Abdin Pasha was ordered to suppress the rebels, but failed, and had to retreat to Mocha. Al-Mu'ayyad Muhammad expelled the Ottomans from Sana'a in 1628, only Zabid and Mocha remained under Ottoman possession. Al-Mu'ayyad Muhammad captured Zabid in 1634 and allowed the Ottomans to leave Mocha peacefully. The reason behind Al-Mu'ayyad Muhammad's success was the possession of firearms by the tribes and their unity behind him.

In 1632, Al-Mu'ayyad Muhammad sent an expeditionary force of 1,000 men to conquer Mecca. The army entered the city in triumph and killed its governor. The Ottomans were not ready to lose Mecca after Yemen, so they sent an army from Egypt to fight the Yemenites. Seeing that the Turkish army was too numerous to overcome, the Yemeni army retreated to a valley outside Mecca. Ottoman troops attacked the Yemenis by hiding at the wells that supplied them with water. This plan proceeded successfully, causing the Yemenis over 200 casualties, most from thirst. The tribesmen eventually surrendered and returned to Yemen. Al-Mu'ayyad Muhammad died in 1644. He was succeeded by Al-Mutawakkil Isma'il, another son of al-Mansur al-Qasim, who conquered Yemen in its entirety, from Asir in the north to Dhofar in the east. During his reign, and during the reign of his successor, Al-Mahdi Ahmad (1676–1681), the imamate implemented some of the harshest discriminatory laws (ghiyar) against the Jews of Yemen, which culminated in the expulsion of all Jews (Exile of Mawza) to a hot and arid region in the Tihama coastal plain. The Qasimid state was the strongest Zaydi state to ever exist. See Yemeni Zaidi State for more information.

During that period, Yemen was the sole coffee producer in the world. The country established diplomatic relations with the Safavid dynasty of Persia, Ottomans of Hejaz, Mughal Empire in India, and Ethiopia, as well. Fasilides of Ethiopia sent three diplomatic missions to Yemen, but the relations did not develop into a political alliance, as Fasilides had hoped, due to the rise of powerful feudalists in his country. In the first half of the 18th century, the Europeans broke Yemen's monopoly on coffee by smuggling coffee trees and cultivating them in their own colonies in the East Indies, East Africa, the West Indies, and Latin America. The imamate did not follow a cohesive mechanism for succession, and family quarrels and tribal insubordination led to the political decline of the Qasimi dynasty in the 18th century. In 1728 or 1731, the chief representative of Lahej declared himself an independent sultan in defiance of the Qasimid dynasty and conquered Aden, thus establishing the Sultanate of Lahej. The rising power of the fervently Islamist Wahhabi movement on the Arabian Peninsula cost the Zaidi state its coastal possessions after 1803. The imam was able to regain them temporarily in 1818, but new intervention by the Ottoman viceroy of Egypt in 1833 again wrested the coast from the ruler in Sana'a. After 1835, the imamate changed hands with great frequency and some imams were assassinated. After 1849, the Zaidi polity descended into chaos that lasted for decades.

Great Britain and the Nine Regions 

The British were looking for a coal depot to service their steamers en route to India. It took 700 tons of coal for a round-trip from Suez to Bombay. East India Company officials decided on Aden. The British Empire tried to reach an agreement with the Zaydi imam of Sana'a, permitting them a foothold in Mocha, and when unable to secure their position, they extracted a similar agreement from the Sultan of Lahej, enabling them to consolidate a position in Aden. An incident played into British hands when, while passing Aden for trading purposes, one of their sailing ships sank and Arab tribesmen boarded it and plundered its contents. The British India government dispatched a warship under the command of Captain Stafford Bettesworth Haines to demand compensation.

Haines bombarded Aden from his warship in January 1839. The ruler of Lahej, who was in Aden at the time, ordered his guards to defend the port, but they failed in the face of overwhelming military and naval power. The British managed to occupy Aden and agreed to compensate the sultan with an annual payment of 6,000 riyals. The British evicted the Sultan of Lahej from Aden and forced him to accept their "protection". In November 1839, 5,000 tribesmen tried to retake the town but were repulsed and 200 were killed. The British realised that Aden's prosperity depended on their relations with the neighbouring tribes, which required that they rest on a firm and satisfactory basis.

The British government concluded "protection and friendship" treaties with nine tribes surrounding Aden, whereas they would remain independent from British interference in their affairs as long as they did not conclude treaties with foreigners (non-Arab colonial powers). Aden was declared a free zone in 1850. With emigrants from India, East Africa, and Southeast Asia, Aden grew into a world city. In 1850, only 980 Arabs were registered as original inhabitants of the city. The English presence in Aden put them at odds with the Ottomans. The Turks asserted to the British that they held sovereignty over the whole of Arabia, including Yemen as the successor of Mohammed and the Chief of the Universal Caliphate.

Ottoman return 

The Ottomans were concerned about the British expansion from the British ruled subcontinent to the Red Sea and Arabia. They returned to the Tihama in 1849 after an absence of two centuries. Rivalries and disturbances continued among the Zaydi imams, between them and their deputies, with the ulema, with the heads of tribes, as well as with those who belonged to other sects. Some citizens of Sana'a were desperate to return law and order to Yemen and asked the Ottoman Pasha in Tihama to pacify the country. Yemeni merchants knew that the return of the Ottomans would improve their trade, for the Ottomans would become their customers. An Ottoman expedition force tried to capture Sana'a, but was defeated and had to evacuate the highlands. The Opening of the Suez Canal in 1869, strengthened the Ottoman decision to remain in Yemen. In 1872, military forces were dispatched from Constantinople and moved beyond the Ottoman stronghold in the lowlands (Tihama) to conquer Sana'a. By 1873, the Ottomans succeeded in conquering the northern highlands. Sana'a became the administrative capital of Yemen Vilayet.

The Ottomans learned from their previous experience and worked on the disempowerment of local lords in the highland regions. They even attempted to secularize the Yemeni society, while Yemenite Jews came to perceive themselves in Yemeni nationalist terms. The Ottomans appeased the tribes by forgiving their rebellious chiefs and appointing them to administrative posts. They introduced a series of reforms to enhance the country's economic welfare. However, corruption was widespread in the Ottoman administration in Yemen. This was because only the worst of the officials were appointed because those who could avoid serving in Yemen did so. The Ottomans had reasserted control over the highlands for a temporary duration. The so-called Tanzimat reforms were considered heretic by the Zaydi tribes. In 1876, the Hashid and Bakil tribes rebelled against the Ottomans; the Turks had to appease them with gifts to end the uprising.

The tribal chiefs were difficult to appease and an endless cycle of violence curbed Ottoman efforts to pacify the land. Ahmed Izzet Pasha proposed that the Ottoman army evacuate the highlands and confine itself to Tihama, and not unnecessarily burden itself with continuing military operation against the Zaydi tribes. The hit-and-run tactics of the northern highlands tribesmen wore out the Ottoman military. They resented the Turkish Tanzimat and defied all attempts to impose a central government upon them. The northern tribes united under the leadership of the House of Hamidaddin in 1890. Imam Yahya Hamidaddin led a rebellion against the Turks in 1904; the rebels disrupted the Ottoman ability to govern. The revolts between 1904 and 1911 were especially damaging to the Ottomans, costing them as many as 10,000 soldiers and as much as 500,000 pounds per year. The Ottomans signed a treaty with imam Yahya Hamidaddin in 1911. Under the treaty, Imam Yahya was recognized as an autonomous leader of the Zaydi northern highlands. The Ottomans continued to rule Shafi'i areas in the mid-south until their departure in 1918.

Mutawakkilite Kingdom of Yemen 

Imam Yahya hamid ed-Din al-Mutawakkil was ruling the northern highlands independently from 1911. After the Ottoman departure in 1918, he sought to recapture the lands of his Qasimid ancestors. He dreamed of Greater Yemen stretching from Asir to Dhofar. These schemes brought him into conflict with the de facto rulers in the territories claimed, namely the Idrisids, Ibn Saud, and the British government in Aden. The Zaydi imam did not recognize the Anglo-Ottoman border agreement of 1905 on the grounds that it was made between two foreign powers occupying Yemen. The border treaty effectively divided Yemen into north and south. In 1915, the British signed a treaty with the Idrisids guaranteeing their security and independence if they would fight against the Turks. In 1919, Imam Yahya hamid ed-Din moved southward to "liberate" the nine British protectorates. The British responded by moving quickly towards Tihama and occupying al-Hudaydah. Then they handed it over to their Idrisi allies. Imam Yahya attacked the southern protectorates again in 1922. The British bombed Yahya's tribal forces using aircraft to which the tribes had no effective counter.

In 1925, Imam Yahya captured al-Hudaydah from the Idrisids. He continued to follow and attack the Idrisids until Asir fell under the control of the imam's forces, forcing the Idrisi to request an agreement that would enable them to administer the region in the name of the imam. Imam Yahya refused the offer on the grounds that the Idrisis were of Moroccan descent. According to Imam Yahya, the Idrisis, along with the British, were nothing but recent intruders and should be driven out of Yemen permanently. Small Bedouin forces, mainly from the Madh'hij confederation of Marib, attacked Shabwah but were bombed by the British and had to retreat.

The Italian Empire was the first to recognize Imam Yahya as the King of Yemen in 1926. This created a great deal of anxiety for the British, who interpreted it as recognition of Imam Yahya's claim to sovereignty over Greater Yemen, which included the Aden protectorate and Asir. The Idrisis turned to Ibn Saud seeking his protection from Yahya Muhammad Hamid ed-Din. However, in 1932, the Idrisis broke their accord with Ibn Saud and went back to Imam Yahya seeking help against Ibn Saud himself, who had begun liquidating their authority and expressed his desire to annex those territories into his own Saudi domain. Imam Yahya demanded the return of all Idrisi dominion. That same year, a group of Hejazi liberals fled to Yemen and plotted to expel Ibn Saud from the former Hashemite Kingdom of Hejaz, which had been conquered by the Saudis seven years earlier. Ibn Saud appealed to Britain for aid. The British government sent arms and aeroplanes . The British were anxious that Ibn Saud's financial difficulties may encourage the Italian Empire to bail him out. Ibn Saud suppressed the Asiri rebellion in 1933, after which the Idrisids fled to Sana'a. Negotiations between the Imam Yahya Hamid ed-Din and Ibn Saud proved fruitless. After the 1934 Saudi-Yemeni war, Ibn Saud announced a ceasefire in May 1934. Imam Yahya agreed to release Saudi hostages and the surrender of the Idrisis to Saudi custody. Imam Yahya ceded the three provinces of Najran, Asir, and Jazan for 20 years. and signed another treaty with the British government in 1934. The imam recognized the British sovereignty over Aden protectorate for 40 years. Out of fear for Hudaydah, Yahya did submit to these demands. According to Bernard Reich, Professor of Political Science and International Affairs at George Washington University, Yahya could have done better by reorganizing the Zaydi tribes of the northern highlands as his ancestors did against the Turks and British intruders and turn the lands they captured into another graveyard.

Colonial Aden 

Starting in 1890, hundreds of Yemeni people from Hajz, Al-Baetha, and Taiz migrated to Aden to work at ports, and as labourers. This helped the population of Aden once again become predominantly Arab after, having been declared a free zone, it had become mostly foreigners. During World War II, Aden had increasing economic growth and became the second-busiest port in the world after New York City. After the rise of labour unions, a rift was apparent between the sectors of workers and the first signs of resistance to the occupation started in 1943. Muhammad Ali Luqman founded the first Arabic club and school in Aden, and was the first to start working towards a union.

The Colony of Aden was divided into an eastern colony and a western colony. Those were further divided into 23 sultanates and emirates, and several independent tribes that had no relationships with the sultanates. The deal between the sultanates and Britain detailed protection and complete control of foreign relations by the British. The Sultanate of Lahej was the only one in which the sultan was referred to as His Highness. The Federation of South Arabia was created by the British to counter Arab nationalism by giving more freedom to the rulers of the nations.

The North Yemen Civil War inspired many in the south to rise against the British rule. The National Liberation Front (NLF) of Yemen was formed with the leadership of Qahtan Muhammad Al-Shaabi. The NLF hoped to destroy all the sultanates and eventually unite with the Yemen Arab Republic. Most of the support for the NLF came from Radfan and Yafa, so the British launched Operation Nutcracker, which completely burned Radfan in January 1964.

Two states 

Arab nationalism made an impact in some circles who opposed the lack of modernization efforts in the Mutawakkilite monarchy. This became apparent when Imam Ahmad bin Yahya died in 1962. He was succeeded by his son, but army officers attempted to seize power, sparking the North Yemen Civil War. The Hamidaddin royalists were supported by Saudi Arabia, Britain, and Jordan (mostly with weapons and financial aid, but also with small military forces), whilst the military rebels were backed by Egypt. Egypt provided the rebels with weapons and financial assistance, but also sent a large military force to participate in the fighting. Israel covertly supplied weapons to the royalists to keep the Egyptian military busy in Yemen and make Nasser less likely to initiate a conflict in the Sinai.
After six years of civil war, the military rebels were victorious (February 1968) and formed the Yemen Arab Republic.

The revolution in the north coincided with the Aden Emergency, which hastened the end of British rule in the south. On 30 November 1967, the state of South Yemen was formed, comprising Aden and the former Protectorate of South Arabia. This socialist state was later officially known as the People's Democratic Republic of Yemen and a programme of nationalisation was begun.

Relations between the two Yemeni states fluctuated between peaceful and hostile. The South was supported by the Eastern bloc. The North, however, was not able to get the same connections. In 1972, the two states fought a war. The war was resolved with a ceasefire and negotiations brokered by the Arab League, where it was declared that unification would eventually occur. In 1978, Ali Abdullah Saleh was named as president of the Yemen Arab Republic.
After the war, the North complained about the South's help from foreign countries. This included Saudi Arabia.

In 1979, fresh fighting between the two states resumed and efforts were renewed to bring about unification.

Thousands were killed in 1986 in the South Yemen Civil War. President Ali Nasser Muhammad fled to the north and was later sentenced to death for treason. A new government formed.

Unification and civil war 

In 1990, the two governments reached a full agreement on the joint governing of Yemen, and the countries were merged on 22 May 1990, with Saleh as president. The President of South Yemen, Ali Salim al-Beidh, became vice president. A unified parliament was formed and a unity constitution was agreed upon. In the 1993 parliamentary election, the first held after unification, the General People's Congress won 122 of 301 seats.

After the invasion of Kuwait crisis in 1990, Yemen's president opposed military intervention from non-Arab states. As a member of the United Nations Security Council for 1990 and 1991, Yemen abstained on a number of UNSC resolutions concerning Iraq and Kuwait and voted against the "...use of force resolution." The vote outraged the U.S. Saudi Arabia expelled 800,000 Yemenis in 1990 and 1991 to punish Yemen for its opposition to the intervention.

In the absence of strong state institutions, elite politics in Yemen constituted a de facto form of collaborative governance, where competing tribal, regional, religious, and political interests agreed to hold themselves in check through tacit acceptance of the balance it produced. The informal political settlement was held together by a power-sharing deal among three men: President Saleh, who controlled the state; major general Ali Mohsen al-Ahmar, who controlled the largest share of the Republic of Yemen Armed Forces; and Abdullah ibn Husayn al-Ahmar, figurehead of the Islamist al-Islah party and Saudi Arabia's chosen broker of transnational patronage payments to various political players, including tribal sheikhs. The Saudi payments have been intended to facilitate the tribes' autonomy from the Yemeni government and to give the Saudi government a mechanism with which to weigh in on Yemen's political decision-making.

Following food riots in major towns in 1992, a new coalition government made up of the ruling parties from both the former Yemeni states was formed in 1993. However, Vice President al-Beidh withdrew to Aden in August 1993 and said he would not return to the government until his grievances were addressed. These included northern violence against his Yemeni Socialist Party, as well as the economic marginalization of the south. Negotiations to end the political deadlock dragged on into 1994. The government of Prime Minister Haydar Abu Bakr Al-Attas became ineffective due to political infighting.

An accord between northern and southern leaders was signed in Amman, Jordan on 20 February 1994, but this could not stop the civil war. During these tensions, both the northern and southern armies (which had never integrated) gathered on their respective frontiers. The May – July 1994 civil war in Yemen resulted in the defeat of the southern armed forces and the flight into exile of many Yemeni Socialist Party leaders and other southern secessionists. Saudi Arabia actively aided the south during the 1994 civil war.

Contemporary Yemen 

Ali Abdullah Saleh became Yemen's first directly elected president in the 1999 presidential election, winning 96.2 per cent of the vote. The only other candidate, Najeeb Qahtan Al-Sha'abi, was the son of Qahtan Muhammad al-Sha'abi, a former president of South Yemen. Though a member of Saleh's General People's Congress (GPC) party, Najeeb ran as an independent.

In October 2000, 17 U.S. personnel died after a suicide attack on the U.S. naval vessel USS Cole in Aden, which was subsequently blamed on al-Qaeda. After the September 11 attacks on the United States, President Saleh assured U.S. President George W. Bush that Yemen was a partner in his War on Terror. In 2001, violence surrounded a referendum, which apparently supported extending Saleh's rule and powers.

The Shia insurgency in Yemen began in June 2004 when dissident cleric Hussein Badreddin al-Houthi, head of the Zaidi Shia sect, launched an uprising against the Yemeni government. The Yemeni government alleged that the Houthis were seeking to overthrow it and to implement Shī'ite religious law. The rebels counter that they are "defending their community against discrimination" and government aggression.

In 2005, at least 36 people were killed in clashes across the country between police and protesters over rising fuel prices.

In the 2006 presidential election, held on 20 September, Saleh won with 77.2% of the vote. His main rival, Faisal bin Shamlan, received 21.8%. Saleh was sworn in for another term on 27 September.

A suicide bomber killed eight Spanish tourists and two Yemenis in the province of Marib in July 2007. A series of bomb attacks occurred on police, official, diplomatic, foreign business, and tourism targets in 2008. Car bombings outside the U.S. embassy in Sana'a killed 18 people, including six of the assailants in September 2008. In 2008, an opposition rally in Sana'a demanding electoral reform was met with police gunfire.

Social hierarchy

There is a system of social stratification in Yemen that was officially abolished at the creation of the Republic of Yemen in 1962 but, in practice, this system has not disappeared and Yemeni society is still organized around hierarchical ranks. The difference between ranks is manifested by descent and occupation and is consolidated by marriages between people of the same ranks.

There are five status groups. At the top of hierarchy, there are the religious elites, also called sada. These are then followed by the strata of judges (quad). The third hierarchical status is the qaba’il, who are the peasants who belong to tribes and who live mainly from agriculture and trading. The fourth group is called the mazayanah. This group is composed of people who had no land and provide different kinds of services such as butchers and craftsmen. Finally, at the bottom of the hierarchy are the slaves (a’bid) and even further below them Al-Akhdam, which means servants.

Al-Qaeda 
In January 2009, the Saudi Arabian and Yemeni al-Qaeda branches merged to form Al-Qaeda in the Arabian Peninsula, which is based in Yemen, and many of its members were Saudi nationals who had been released from Guantanamo Bay. Saleh released 176 al-Qaeda suspects on condition of good behaviour, but terrorist activities continued.

The Yemeni army launched a fresh offensive against the Shia insurgents in 2009, assisted by Saudi forces. Tens of thousands of people were displaced by the fighting. A new ceasefire was agreed upon in February 2010. However, by the end of the year, Yemen claimed that 3,000 soldiers had been killed in renewed fighting. The Shia rebels accused Saudi Arabia of providing support to salafi groups to suppress Zaidism in Yemen.

On orders from U.S. President Barack Obama, U.S. warplanes fired cruise missiles at what officials in Washington claimed were Al Qaeda training camps in the provinces of Sana'a and Abyan on 17 December 2009. Instead of hitting Al-Qaeda operatives, it hit a village, killing 55 civilians. Officials in Yemen said that the attacks claimed the lives of more than 60 civilians, 28 of them children. Another airstrike was carried out on 24 December.

The U.S. launched a series of drone attacks in Yemen to curb a perceived growing terror threat due to political chaos in Yemen. Since December 2009, U.S. strikes in Yemen have been carried out by the U.S. military with intelligence support from the CIA. The drone strikes are protested by human-rights groups who say they kill innocent civilians, and that the U.S. military and CIA drone strikes lack sufficient congressional oversight, including the choice of human targets suspected of being threats to America. Controversy over U.S. policy for drone attacks mushroomed after a September 2011 drone strike in Yemen killed Anwar al-Awlaki and Samir Khan, both U.S. citizens. Another drone strike in October 2011 killed Anwar's teenage son, Abdulrahman al-Awlaki.

In 2010, the Obama administration policy allowed targeting of people whose names are not known. The U.S. government increased military aid to $140 million in 2010. U.S. drone strikes continued after the ousting of President Saleh.

, Shi'a Houthis are fighting against the Islamic State, Al Qaeda, and Saudi Arabia. The U.S. supports the Saudi-led military intervention in Yemen against the Houthis, but many in US SOCOM reportedly favor Houthis, as they have been an effective force to roll back al-Qaeda and recently ISIL in Yemen. The Guardian reported that "The only groups poised to benefit from the war dragging on are the jihadis of Islamic State (ISIL) and Al-Qaeda in the Arabian Peninsula (AQAP), the latter's most powerful franchise, who are likely to gain influence amid the chaos. ISIL has claimed recent, bloody suicide bombings in Houthi mosques and Sana'a when it once had no known presence in the country, while AQAP has continued to seize territory in eastern Yemen unhindered by American drone strikes." In February 2016 Al-Qaeda forces and Saudi-led coalition forces were both seen fighting Houthi rebels in the same battle.

Revolution and aftermath 

The 2011 Yemeni revolution followed other Arab Spring mass protests in early 2011. The uprising was initially against unemployment, economic conditions, and corruption, as well as against the government's proposals to modify the constitution of Yemen so that Saleh's son could inherit the presidency.

In March 2011, police snipers opened fire on a pro-democracy camp in Sana'a, killing more than 50 people. In May, dozens were killed in clashes between troops and tribal fighters in Sana'a. By this point, Saleh began to lose international support. In October 2011, Yemeni human rights activist Tawakul Karman won the Nobel Peace Prize, and the UN Security Council condemned the violence and called for a transfer of power. On 23 November 2011, Saleh flew to Riyadh, in neighbouring Saudi Arabia, to sign the Gulf Co-operation Council plan for political transition, which he had previously spurned. Upon signing the document, he agreed to legally transfer the office and powers of the presidency to his deputy, Vice President Abdrabbuh Mansur Hadi.

Hadi took office for a two-year term upon winning the uncontested presidential elections in February 2012. A unity government – including a prime minister from the opposition – was formed. Al-Hadi would oversee the drafting of a new constitution, followed by parliamentary and presidential elections in 2014. Saleh returned in February 2012. In the face of objections from thousands of street protesters, parliament granted him full immunity from prosecution. Saleh's son, General Ahmed Ali Abdullah Saleh, continues to exercise a strong hold on sections of the military and security forces.

AQAP claimed responsibility for a February 2012 suicide attack on the presidential palace that killed 26 Republican Guards on the day that President Hadi was sworn in. AQAP was also behind a suicide bombing that killed 96 soldiers in Sana'a three months later. In September 2012, a car bomb attack in Sana'a killed 11 people, a day after a local al-Qaeda leader Said al-Shihri was reported killed in the south.

By 2012, there has been a "small contingent of U.S. special-operations troops" – in addition to CIA and "unofficially acknowledged" U.S. military presence – in response to increasing terror attacks by AQAP on Yemeni citizens. Many analysts have pointed out the former Yemeni government role in cultivating terrorist activity in the country. Following the election of the new president, Abdrabbuh Mansur Hadi, the Yemeni military was able to push Ansar al-Sharia back and recapture the Shabwah Governorate.

The central government in Sana'a remained weak, staving off challenges from southern separatists and Shia rebels as well as AQAP. The Shia insurgency intensified after Hadi took power, escalating in September 2014 as anti-government forces led by Abdul-Malik al-Houthi swept into the capital and forced Hadi to agree to a "unity" government. The Houthis then refused to participate in the government, although they continued to apply pressure on Hadi and his ministers, even shelling the president's private residence and placing him under house arrest, until the government's mass resignation in January 2015. The following month, the Houthis dissolved parliament and declared that a Revolutionary Committee under Mohammed Ali al-Houthi was the interim authority in Yemen. Abdul-Malik al-Houthi, a cousin of the new acting president, called the takeover a "glorious revolution". However, the "constitutional declaration" of 6 February 2015 was widely rejected by opposition politicians and foreign governments, including the United Nations.

Hadi managed to flee from Sana'a to Aden, his hometown and stronghold in the south, on 21 February 2015. He promptly gave a televised speech rescinding his resignation, condemning the coup, and calling for recognition as the constitutional president of Yemen. The following month, Hadi declared Aden Yemen's "temporary" capital. The Houthis, however, rebuffed an initiative by the Gulf Cooperation Council and continued to move south toward Aden. All U.S. personnel were evacuated and President Hadi was forced to flee the country to Saudi Arabia. On 26 March 2015, Saudi Arabia announced Operation Decisive Storm and began airstrikes and announced its intentions to lead a military coalition against the Houthis, whom they claimed were being aided by Iran, and began a force buildup along the Yemeni border. The coalition included the United Arab Emirates, Kuwait, Qatar, Bahrain, Jordan, Morocco, Sudan, Egypt, and Pakistan. The United States announced that it was assisting with intelligence, targeting, and logistics. Saudi Arabia and Egypt would not rule out ground operations. After Hadi troops took control of Aden from Houthis, jihadist groups became active in the city, and some terrorist incidents were linked to them such as Missionaries of Charity attack in Aden on 4 March 2016. Since February 2018, Aden has been seized by the UAE-backed separatist Southern Transitional Council.

Yemen has been suffering from a famine since 2016 as a result of the Civil War. More than 50,000 children in Yemen died from starvation in 2017. The famine is being compounded by an outbreak of cholera that has affected more than one million people. The Saudi Arabian-led intervention in Yemen and blockade of Yemen have contributed to the famine and cholera epidemic. The UN estimated that by the end of 2021, the war in Yemen would have caused over 377,000 deaths, and roughly 70% of deaths were children under age 5.

On 4 December 2017, deposed strongman and former president Ali Abdullah Saleh, accused of treason, was assassinated by Houthis whilst attempting to flee clashes near rebel-held Sana'a between Houthi and pro-Saleh forces.

After losing the support of the Saudi-led coalition, Yemen's President Abd Rabbuh Mansur Hadi resigned and Presidential Leadership Council took power in April 2022.

Geography 

A number of Red Sea islands, including the Hanish Islands, Kamaran, and Perim, as well as Socotra in the Arabian Sea, belong to Yemen; the largest of these is Socotra. Many of the islands are volcanic; for example Jabal al-Tair had a volcanic eruption in 2007, and before that in 1883. Although mainland Yemen is in the southern Arabian Peninsula and thus part of Asia, and its Hanish Islands and Perim in the Red Sea are associated with Asia, the archipelago of Socotra, which lies east of the horn of Somalia and is much closer to Africa than to Asia, is geographically and biogeographically associated with Africa. Socotra faces the Guardafui Channel and the Somali Sea.

Regions and climate 

Yemen can be divided geographically into four main regions: the coastal plains in the west, the western highlands, the eastern highlands, and the Rub' al Khali in the east. The Tihāmah ("hot lands" or "hot earth") form a very arid and flat coastal plain along Yemen's entire Red Sea coastline. Despite the aridity, the presence of many lagoons makes this region very marshy and a suitable breeding ground for malaria mosquitos. Extensive crescent-shaped sand dunes are present. The evaporation in the Tihamah is so great that streams from the highlands never reach the sea, but they do contribute to extensive groundwater reserves. Today, these are heavily exploited for agricultural use. The Tihamah ends abruptly at the escarpment of the western highlands. Temperatures are warm in the day but fall dramatically at night. Perennial streams occur in the highlands, but these never reach the sea because of high evaporation in the Tihamah.

This area is drier than the western highlands because of rain-shadow influences, but still receives sufficient rain in wet years for extensive cropping. Water storage allows for irrigation and the growing of wheat and barley. Sana'a is in this region.

Yemen's portion of the Rub al Khali desert in the east is much lower, generally below , and receives almost no rain. It is populated only by Bedouin herders of camels. The growing scarcity of water is a source of increasing international concern.

Biodiversity 

Yemen contains six terrestrial ecoregions: Arabian Peninsula coastal fog desert, Socotra Island xeric shrublands, Southwestern Arabian foothills savanna, Southwestern Arabian montane woodlands, Arabian Desert, and Red Sea Nubo-Sindian tropical desert and semi-desert.

The flora of Yemen is a mixture of the tropical African, Sudanian plant geographical region and the Saharo-Arabian region. The Sudanian element—characterized by relatively high rainfall—dominates the western mountains and parts of the highland plains. The Saharo-Arabian element dominates in the coastal plains, eastern mountain, and the eastern and northern desert plains. A high percentage of Yemen plants belong to tropical African plants of Sudanian regions. Among the Sudanian element species, the following may be mentioned: Ficus spp., Acacia mellifera, Grewia villosa, Commiphora spp., Rosa abyssinica, Cadaba farinosa and others. Among the Saharo-Arabian species, these may be mentioned: Panicum turgidum, Aerva javanica, Zygophyllum simplex, Fagonia indica, Salsola spp., Acacia tortilis, A. hamulos, A. ehrenbergiana, Phoenix dactylifera, Hyphaene thebaica, Capparis decidua, Salvadora persica, Balanites aegyptiaca, and many others. Many of the Saharo-Arabian species are endemic to the extensive sandy coastal plain (the Tihamah).

Among the fauna, the Arabian leopard, which would inhabit the mountains, is considered rare here.

Politics 

Yemen is a republic with a bicameral legislature. Under the 1991 constitution, an elected president, an elected 301-seat Assembly of Representatives, and an appointed 111-member Shura Council share power. The President is the head of state, and the Prime Minister is the head of government. In Sana'a, a Supreme Political Council (not recognized internationally) forms the government.

The 1991 constitution provides that the president be elected by popular vote from at least two candidates endorsed by at least 15 members of the Parliament. The prime minister, in turn, is appointed by the president and must be approved by two-thirds of the Parliament. The presidential term of office is seven years, and the parliamentary term of elected office is six years. Suffrage is universal for people age 18 and older, but only Muslims may hold elected office.

President Ali Abdullah Saleh became the first elected president in reunified Yemen in 1999 (though he had been President of unified Yemen since 1990 and president of North Yemen since 1978). He was re-elected to office in September 2006. Saleh's victory was marked by an election that international observers judged was "partly free", though the election was accompanied by violence, violations of press freedoms, and allegations of fraud.
Parliamentary elections were held in April 2003, and the General People's Congress  maintained an absolute majority. Saleh remained almost uncontested in his seat of power until 2011, when local frustration at his refusal to hold another round of elections, as combined with the impact of the 2011 Arab Spring, resulted in mass protests. In 2012, he was forced to resign from power, though he remained an important actor in Yemeni politics, allying with the Houthis during their takeover in the mid-2010s.

The constitution calls for an independent judiciary. The former northern and southern legal codes have been unified. The legal system includes separate commercial courts and a Supreme Court based in Sana'a. Sharia is the main source of laws, with many court cases being debated according to the religious basis of law and many judges being religious scholars as well as legal authorities. The Prison Authority Organization Act, Republican decree no. 48 (1981), and Prison Act regulations, provide the legal framework for management of the country's prison system.

Foreign relations 

The geography and ruling imams of North Yemen kept the country isolated from foreign influence before 1962. The country's relations with Saudi Arabia were defined by the Taif Agreement of 1934, which delineated the northernmost part of the border between the two kingdoms and set the framework for commercial and other intercourse. The Taif Agreement has been renewed periodically in 20-year increments, and its validity was reaffirmed in 1995. Relations with the British colonial authorities in Aden and the south were usually tense.

The Soviet and Chinese Aid Missions established in 1958 and 1959 were the first important non-Muslim presences in North Yemen. Following the September 1962 revolution, the Yemen Arab Republic became closely allied with and heavily dependent upon Egypt. Saudi Arabia aided the royalists in their attempt to defeat the Republicans and did not recognize the Yemen Arab Republic until 1970. At the same time, Saudi Arabia maintained direct contact with Yemeni tribes, which sometimes strained its official relations with the Yemeni Government. Saudi Arabia remained hostile to any form of political and social reform in Yemen and continued to provide financial support for tribal elites.

In February 1989, North Yemen joined Iraq, Jordan, and Egypt in forming the Arab Cooperation Council (ACC), an organization created partly in response to the founding of the Gulf Cooperation Council and intended to foster closer economic cooperation and integration among its members. After unification, the Republic of Yemen was accepted as a member of the ACC in place of its YAR predecessor. In the wake of the Persian Gulf crisis, the ACC has remained inactive. Yemen is not a member of the Gulf Cooperation Council mainly for its republican government.

Yemen is a member of the United Nations, the Arab League, and the Organisation of Islamic Cooperation, and also participates in the nonaligned movement. The Republic of Yemen accepted responsibility for all treaties and debts of its predecessors, the Yemen Arab Republic (YAR) and the People's Democratic Republic of Yemen (PDRY). Yemen has acceded to the Treaty on the Non-Proliferation of Nuclear Weapons.

Since the end of the 1994 civil war, tangible progress has been made on the diplomatic front in restoring normal relations with Yemen's neighbors. In the summer of 2000, Yemen and Saudi Arabia signed an International Border Treaty settling a 50-year-old dispute over the location of the border between the two countries. Until the signing of the Yemen-Saudi Arabia peace treaty in July 2000, Yemen's northern border was undefined; the Arabian Desert prevented any human habitation there. Yemen settled its dispute with Eritrea over the Hanish Islands in 1998. The Saudi – Yemen barrier was constructed by Saudi Arabia against an influx of illegal immigrants and against the smuggling of drugs and weapons. The Independent headed an article with "Saudi Arabia, one of the most vocal critics in the Arab world of Israel's "security fence" in the West Bank, is quietly emulating the Israeli example by erecting a barrier along its porous border with Yemen."

In March 2020, the Trump administration and key US allies, including Saudi Arabia and the United Arab Emirates, cut off tens of millions of dollars for health care programs and other aid to the United Nations' appeal for Yemen. As a result of funding cuts, the United Nations Office for the Coordination of Humanitarian Affairs (UNOCHA) stated that the UN agencies were forced to either close or reduce more than 75 per cent of its programs that year alone, affecting more than 8 million people. Saudi Arabia had been leading a Western-backed military coalition, including the United Arab Emirates as a key member, which intervened in Yemen in 2015, in a bid to restore the government ousted from power by the Houthi movement. The United Nations described the situation in Yemen, where the war killed tens of thousands of people and left millions on the brink of famine, as the world's worst humanitarian crisis.

Military 

The armed forces of Yemen include the Yemen Army (includes Republican Guard), Navy (includes Marines), Yemeni Air Force (Al Quwwat al Jawwiya al Yamaniya; includes Air Defense Force). A major reorganization of the armed forces continues. The unified air forces and air defenses are now under one command. The navy has concentration in Aden. Total armed forces manning numbers about 401,000 active personnel, including moreover especially conscripts. The Yemen Arab Republic and The People's Democratic Republic of Yemen joined to form the Republic of Yemen on 22 May 1990. The supreme commander of the armed forces is the President of the Republic of Yemen.

The number of military personnel in Yemen is relatively high; in sum, Yemen has the second largest military force on the Arabian Peninsula after Saudi Arabia. In 2012, total active troops were estimated as follows: army, 390,000; navy, 7,000; and air force, 5,000. In September 2007, the government announced the reinstatement of compulsory military service. Yemen's defense budget, which in 2006 represented approximately 40 percent of the total government budget, is expected to remain high for the near term, as the military draft takes effect and internal security threats continue to escalate. By 2012, Yemen had 401,000 active personnel.

Human rights 

The government and its security forces, often considered to suffer from rampant corruption, have been responsible for torture, inhumane treatment, and extrajudicial executions. There are arbitrary arrests of citizens, especially in the south, as well as arbitrary searches of homes. Prolonged pretrial detention is a serious problem, and judicial corruption, inefficiency, and executive interference undermine due process. Freedom of speech, the press, and religion are all restricted. Journalists critical of the government are often harassed and threatened by the police. Homosexuality is illegal, punishable by death.

Yemen is ranked last of 135 countries in the 2012 Global Gender Gap Report. Human Rights Watch reported on discrimination and violence against women as well as on the abolition of the minimum marriage age of fifteen for women. The onset of puberty (interpreted by some to be as low as the age of nine) was set as a requirement for marriage instead. Publicity about the case of ten-year-old Yemeni divorcee Nujood Ali brought the child marriage issue to the fore not only in Yemen but also worldwide.

In 2017, the UN Human Rights Council voted to create a team of experts to investigate suspected breaches of humanitarian law and human rights in Yemen. In December 2021, The Guardian revealed, Saudi Arabia used "incentives and threats" as part of a pressure campaign to end a UN inquiry into human rights infringements in Yemen.

On 30 June 2020, a human rights group revealed the scale of torture and deaths in Yemen's unofficial detention centres. UAE and Saudi forces were responsible for some of the most shocking treatment of prisoners, including being hung upside down for hours and sexual torture such as the burning of genitals.

According to 2020 United Nations Population Fund (UNFPA) estimates, 6.1 million girls and women were in need of gender-based violence services. The UNFPA also reported a rise in gender-based violence cases amid COVID-19 pandemic, increase in rate of child marriages, most acutely among internally displaced persons (IDPs). One in five girls aged 10 to 19 were married in IDP camps, compared to 1 in 8 in host communities.

Human trafficking 

The United States Department of State 2013 Trafficking in Persons report classified Yemen as a Tier 3 country, meaning that its government does not fully comply with the minimum standards against human trafficking and is not making significant efforts to do so.

Yemen officially abolished slavery in 1962, but it is still being practiced.

On 22 June 2020, Human Rights Watch wrote an open letter to the UN Secretary-General on "Children and Armed Conflict" report to improve the protection of children in Yemen and in Myanmar. Amnesty said, United Nations Security Council must urgently fix its monitoring and reporting mechanism for children impacted by armed conflict.

On 14 September 2020, Human Rights Watch demanded an end to the interference caused by Houthi rebels and other authorities in Yemen aid operations, as millions of lives dependent on the aid operations were being put at risk.

Administrative divisions 

As of the end of 2004, Yemen was divided into twenty governorates (muhafazat – the latest being Raymah Governorate, which was created during 2004) plus one municipality called "Amanat Al-Asemah" (the latter containing the constitutional capital, Sana'a). An additional governorate (Soqatra Governorate) was created in December 2013 comprising Socotra Island (bottom-right corner of map), previously part of Hadramaut Governorate. The governorates are subdivided into 333 districts (muderiah), which are subdivided into 2,210 sub-districts, and then into 38,284 villages (as of 2001).

In 2014, a constitutional panel decided to divide the country into six regions—four in the north, two in the south, and capital Sana'a outside of any region—creating a federalist model of governance. This federal proposal was a contributing factor toward the Houthis' subsequent coup d'état against the government.

 Saada
 Al Jawf
 Hadhramaut
 Al Mahrah
 Hajjah
 'Amran
 Al Mahwit
 Amanat Al Asimah(Sana'a City)
 Sana'a
 Ma'rib
 Al Hudaydah
 Raymah
 Dhamar
 Ibb
 Dhale
 Al Bayda
 Shabwah
 Taiz
 Lahij
 Abyan
 Aden
 Socotra

Economy 

Yemen  had a GDP (PPP) of US$61.63 billion, with an income per capita of $2,500. Services are the largest economic sector (61.4% of GDP), followed by the industrial sector (30.9%), and agriculture (7.7%). Of these, petroleum production represents around 25% of GDP and 63% of the government's revenue.

Agriculture 

Principal agricultural commodities produced in the nation include grain, vegetables, fruits, pulses, qat, coffee, cotton, dairy products, fish, livestock (sheep, goats, cattle, camels), and poultry.

Most Yemenis are employed in agriculture. However, the role of agricultural sector is limited due to the relatively low share of the sector in GDP and the large share of net food-buying households in Yemen (97%). Sorghum is the most common crop. Cotton and many fruit trees are also grown, with mangoes being the most valuable. A big problem in Yemen is the cultivation of Khat (or qat), a psychoactive plant that releases a stimulant when chewed, and accounts for up to 40 percent of the water drawn from the Sana'a Basin each year, and that figure is rising. Some agricultural practices are drying the Sana'a Basin and displaced vital crops, which has resulted in increasing food prices. Rising food prices, in turn, pushed an additional six percent of the country into poverty in 2008 alone. Efforts are being made by the government and Dawoodi Bohra community at Northern governorates of Yemen to replace qat with coffee plantations.

Industry 
Yemen's industrial sector is centred on crude oil production and petroleum refining, food processing, handicrafts, small-scale production of cotton textiles and leather goods, aluminum products, commercial ship repair, cement, and natural gas production. In 2013, Yemen had an industrial production growth rate of 4.8%. It also has large proven reserves of natural gas. Yemen's first liquified natural gas plant began production in October 2009.

Export and import 
, exports from Yemen totaled $6.694 billion. The main export commodities are crude oil, coffee, dried and salted fish, liquefied natural gas. These products were mainly sent to China (41%), Thailand (19.2%), India (11.4%), and South Korea (4.4%). Imports  total $10.97 billion. The main imported commodities are machinery and equipment, foodstuffs, livestock, and chemicals. These products were mainly imported from the EU (48.8%), UAE (9.8%), Switzerland (8.8%), China (7.4%), and India (5.8%).

State budget 

, the Yemeni government's budget consisted of $7.769 billion in revenues and $12.31 billion in expenditures. Taxes and other revenues constituted roughly 17.7% of the GDP, with a budget deficit of 10.3%. The public debt was 47.1% of GDP. Yemen had reserves of foreign exchange and gold of around $5.538 billion in 2013. Its inflation rate over the same period based on consumer prices was 11.8%. Yemen's external debt totaled $7.806 billion.

International aid
Beginning in the mid-1950s, the Soviet Union and China provided large-scale assistance. For example, China and the United States are involved with the expansion of the Sana'a International Airport. In the south, pre-independence economic activity was overwhelmingly concentrated in the port city of Aden. The seaborne transit trade, which the port relied upon, collapsed with the temporary closure of the Suez Canal and Britain's withdrawal from Aden in 1967.

Since the conclusion of the war, the government made an agreement with the International Monetary Fund (IMF) to implement a structural adjustment program. Phase one of the program included major financial and monetary reforms, including floating the currency, reducing the budget deficit, and cutting subsidies. Phase two addresses structural issues, such as civil service reform.

In early 1995, the government of Yemen launched an economic, financial, and administrative reform program (EFARP) with the support of the World Bank and the IMF, as well as international donors. These programs had a positive impact on Yemen's economy and led to the reduction of the budget deficit to less than 3% of gross domestic product during the period 1995–1999 and the correction of macro-financial imbalances. The real growth rate in the non-oil sector rose by 5.6% from 1995 to 1997.

Water supply and sanitation 

A key challenge is severe water scarcity, especially in the Highlands, prompting The Times, in 2009, to write "Yemen could become first nation to run out of water." A second key challenge is a high level of poverty, making it difficult to recover the costs of service provision. Access to water supply sanitation is low. Yemen is both the poorest country and the most water-scarce country in the Arab world. Third, the capacity of sector institutions to plan, build, operate and maintain infrastructure remains limited. Last but not least the security situation makes it even more difficult to improve or even maintain existing levels of service.

The average Yemeni has access to only 140 cubic meters of water per year (101 gallons per day) for all uses, while the Middle Eastern average is 1000 m3/yr, and the internationally defined threshold for water stress is 1700 cubic meters per year. Yemen's groundwater is the main source of water in the country but the water tables have dropped severely leaving Yemen without a viable source of water. The groundwater has not been regulated by Yemen's governments.

Even before the revolution, Yemen's water situation had been described as increasingly dire by experts who worried that Yemen would be the first country to run out of water. Agriculture in Yemen takes up about 90% of water even though it only generates 6% of GDP. A large portion of Yemenis are dependent on small-scale subsistence agriculture. Half of the agricultural water in Yemen is used to grow khat, a drug that many Yemenis chew.

Due to the 2015 Yemeni civil war, the situation is increasingly dire. 80% of Yemen's population struggles to access water to drink and bathe. Bombing has forced many Yemenis to leave their homes for other areas, and so wells in those areas are under increasing pressure.

Together with partners, UNICEF has advanced its efforts and provided access to safe and sustained drinking water to 8.8 million people (5.3 million children) in Yemen. It scaled up its emergency WASH assistance in Yemen to ensure sustainable WASH services through capacity building of local WASH authorities, solarisation of water systems and rain water harvesting.

Demographics 

Yemen's population is  million by  estimates, with 46% of the population being under 15 years old and 2.7% above 65 years. In 1950, it was 4.3 million. By 2050, the population is estimated to increase to about 60 million. Yemen has a high total fertility rate, at 4.45 children per woman. It is the 30th highest in the world. Sana'a's population has increased rapidly, from roughly 55,000 in 1978 to nearly 1 million in the early 21st century.

Ethnic groups 

Yemeni ethnic groups are predominantly Arabs, followed by Afro-Arabs, South Asians and Europeans. When the former states of North and South Yemen were established, most resident minority groups departed. Yemen is a largely tribal society. In the northern, mountainous parts of the country, there are 400 Zaidi tribes. There are also hereditary caste groups in urban areas such as Al-Akhdam. There are also Yemenis of Persian origin. According to Muqaddasi, Persians formed the majority of Aden's population in the tenth century.

Yemenite Jews once formed a sizable minority in Yemen with a distinct culture from other Jewish communities in the world. Most emigrated to Israel in the mid-20th century, following the Jewish exodus from Arab and Muslim countries and Operation Magic Carpet. An estimated 100,000 people of Indian origin are concentrated in the southern part of the country, around Aden, Mukalla, Shihr, Lahaj, Mokha and Hodeidah.

Most of the prominent Indonesians, Malaysians, and Singaporeans of Arab descent are Hadhrami people with origins in southern Yemen in the Hadramawt coastal region. Today there are almost 10,000 Hadramis in Singapore. The Hadramis migrated to Southeast Asia, East Africa and the Indian subcontinent.

The Maqil were a collection of Arab Bedouin tribes of Yemeni origin who migrated westwards via Egypt. Several groups of Yemeni Arabs turned south to Mauritania, and by the end of the 17th century, they dominated the entire country. They can also be found throughout Morocco and in Algeria as well as in other North African countries.

Yemen is the birthplace of the Arabs and the language; Qahtanite Arabs —the original Arabs — originated in Yemen and they are the ancestors — at least partially — of all Arab tribes.

According to Arab tradition, Ishmael son of Abraham married a woman from the Jurhum tribe.

Yemen is the only country in the Arabian Peninsula that is signatory to two international accords dating back to 1951 and 1967 governing the protection of refugees. Yemen hosted a population of refugees and asylum seekers numbering approximately 124,600 in 2007. Refugees and asylum seekers living in Yemen were predominantly from Somalia (110,600), Iraq (11,000), Ethiopia (2,000), and Syria. Additionally, more than 334,000 Yemenis have been internally displaced by conflict.

The Yemeni diaspora is largely concentrated in neighbouring Saudi Arabia, where between 800,000 and 1 million Yemenis reside, and the United Kingdom, home to between 70,000 and 80,000 Yemenis.

Languages 
Modern Standard Arabic is the official language of Yemen, while Yemeni Arabic is used as the vernacular. In al Mahrah Governorate in the far east and the island of Socotra, several non-Arabic languages are spoken. Yemeni Sign Language is used by the deaf community.

Yemen is part of the homeland of the South Semitic languages. Mehri is the largest South Semitic language spoken in the nation, with more than 70,000 speakers. The ethnic group itself is called Mahra. Soqotri is another South Semitic language, with speakers on the island of Socotra isolated from the pressures of Arabic on the Yemeni mainland. According to the 1990 census in Yemen, the number of speakers there was 57,000.

Yemen was also home of the Old South Arabian languages. The Razihi language appears to be the only remaining Old South Arabian language.

English is the most important foreign language, being widely taught and spoken mostly in the south, a former British colony. There are a significant number of Russian speakers, originating from Yemeni-Russian cross-marriages occurring mainly in the 1970s and 1980s. A small Cham-speaking community is found in the capital city of Sana'a, originating from refugees expatriated from Vietnam after the Vietnam War in the 1970s.

Religion 

Islam is the state religion of Yemen. Religion in Yemen consists primarily of two principal Islamic religious groups: About 35% of the Muslim population is Shia and 65% is Sunni, according to the UNHCR Report. Sunnis are primarily Shafi'i but also include significant groups of Malikis and Hanbalis. Shias are primarily Zaydi and also have significant minorities of Ismaili and Twelver Shias.

The Sunnis are predominantly in the south and southeast. The Zaidis/Shias are predominantly in the north and northwest whilst the Ismailis are in the main centres such as Sana'a and Ma'rib. There are mixed communities in the larger cities. About .05 percent of Yemenis are non-Muslim – adhering to Christianity, Judaism, or Hinduism or having no religious affiliation.

Yemen is number five on Open Doors' 2022 World Watch List, an annual ranking of the 50 countries where Christians face the most extreme persecution. Estimates of the number of Christians in Yemen range from 25,000 to 41,000. A 2015 study estimates 400 Christians from a Muslim background reside in the country.

There are approximately 50 Jews left in Yemen. Some 200 Yemenite Jews were brought to Israel by the Jewish Agency circa 2016. According to a 2020 estimate only estimated 26 Jews remain in Yemen. However, in 2022 it's estimated only one Yemeni Jew remains according to a United Nations report about the treatment of religious minorities in conflict zones; however, there are reportedly a handful of "hidden Jews" in Yemen who have converted to Islam but secretly practice Judaism.

According to WIN/Gallup International polls, Yemen has the most religious population among Arab countries and it is one of the most religious populations world-wide.

Education 

The adult literacy rate in 2010 was 64%. The government has committed to reduce illiteracy to less than 10% by 2025. Although Yemen's government provides for universal, compulsory, free education for children ages six through 15, the U.S. Department of State reports that compulsory attendance is not enforced. The government developed the National Basic Education Development Strategy in 2003 that aimed at providing education to 95% of Yemeni children between the ages of six and 14 years and also at decreasing the gap between males and females in urban and rural areas.

A seven-year project to improve gender equity and the quality and efficiency of secondary education, focusing on girls in rural areas, was approved by the World Bank in March 2008. Following this, Yemen has increased its education spending from 5% of GDP in 1995 to 10% in 2005.

According to the Webometrics Ranking of World Universities, the top-ranking universities in the country are the Yemeni University of Science & Technology (6532nd worldwide), Al Ahgaff University (8930th) and Sanaa University (11043rd). Yemen was ranked 131st in the Global Innovation Index in 2021, down from 129th in 2019.

Health 

Despite the significant progress Yemen has made to expand and improve its health care system over the past decade, the system remains severely underdeveloped. Total expenditures on health care in 2002 constituted 3.7 percent of gross domestic product.

In that same year, the per capita expenditure for health care was very low, as compared with other Middle Eastern countries—US$58 according to United Nations statistics and US$23 according to the World Health Organization. According to the World Bank, the number of doctors in Yemen rose by an average of more than 7 percent between 1995 and 2000, but as of 2004 there were still only three doctors per 10,000 persons. In 2003 Yemen had only 0.6 hospital beds available per 1,000 persons.

Health care services are particularly scarce in rural areas. Only 25 percent of rural areas are covered by health services, as compared with 80 percent of urban areas. Emergency services, such as ambulance service and blood banks, are non-existent.

Culture 

Yemen is a culturally rich country with influence from many civilizations, such as the early civilization of Saba'.

Media 

Radio broadcasting in Yemen began in the 1940s when it was still divided into the South by the British and the North by the Imami ruling system. After the unification of Yemen in 1990, the Yemeni government reformed its corporations and founded some additional radio stations that broadcast locally. However, it drew back after 1994, due to destroyed infrastructure resulting from the civil war.

Television is the most significant media platform in Yemen. Given the low literacy rate in the country, television is the main source of news for Yemenis. There are six free-to-air channels currently headquartered in Yemen, of which four are state-owned.

The Yemeni film industry is in its early stages; only two Yemeni films have been released .

Theatre 
 The history of Yemeni theatre dates back at least a century, to the early 1900s. Both amateur and professional (government-sponsored) theatre troupes perform in the country's major urban centres. Many of Yemen's significant poets and authors, like Ali Ahmed Ba Kathir, Muhammad al-Sharafi, and Wajdi al-Ahdal, have written dramatic works; poems, novels, and short stories by Yemeni authors like Mohammad Abdul-Wali and Abdulaziz Al-Maqaleh have also been adapted for the stage. There have been Yemeni productions of plays by Arab authors such as Tawfiq al-Hakim and Saadallah Wannous and by Western authors, including Shakespeare, Pirandello, Brecht, and Tennessee Williams. Historically speaking, the southern port city of Aden is the cradle of Yemeni theatre; in recent decades the capital, Sana'a, has hosted numerous theatre festivals, often in conjunction with World Theatre Day.

Sport 

Football is the most popular sport in Yemen. The Yemen Football Association is a member of FIFA and AFC. The Yemeni national football team participates internationally. The country also hosts many football clubs. They compete in the national and international leagues.

Yemen's mountains provide many opportunities for outdoor sports, such as biking, rock climbing, trekking, hiking, and other more challenging sports, including mountain climbing.

The coastal areas of Yemen and Socotra Island also provide many opportunities for water sports, such as surfing, bodyboarding, sailing, swimming, and scuba diving. Socotra Island is home to some of the best surfing destinations in the world.

Camel jumping is a traditional sport that is becoming increasingly popular among the Zaraniq tribe on the west coast of Yemen in a desert plain by the Red Sea. Camels are placed side to side and victory goes to the competitor who leaps, from a running start, over the most camels. The jumpers train year round for competitions. Tribesmen (women may not compete) tuck their robes around their waists for freedom of movement while running and leaping.

Yemen's biggest sports event was hosting the 20th Arabian Gulf Cup in Aden and Abyan in the southern part of the country on 22 November 2010. Many thought Yemen was the strongest competitor, but it was defeated in the first three matches of the tournament.

World Heritage sites 

Among Yemen's natural and cultural attractions are four World Heritage sites. The Old Walled City of Shibam in Wadi Hadhramaut, inscribed by UNESCO in 1982, two years after Yemen joined the World Heritage Committee, is nicknamed "Manhattan of the Desert" because of its skyscrapers. Surrounded by a fortified wall made of mud and straw, the 16th-century city is one of the oldest examples of urban planning based on the principle of vertical construction.

Sana'a became a major Islamic centre in the seventh century, and the 103 mosques, 14 hammams (traditional bathhouses), and more than 6,000 houses that survive all date from before the 11th century.

Close to the Red Sea Coast, the historic town of Zabid, inscribed in 1993, was Yemen's capital from the 13th to the 15th century, and is an archaeological and historical site. It played an important role for many centuries because of its university, which was a centre of learning for the whole Arab and Islamic world.

The latest addition to Yemen's list of World Heritage Sites is the Socotra Archipelago. Mentioned by Marco Polo in the 13th century, this remote and isolated archipelago consists of four islands and two rocky islets delineating the southern limit of the Gulf of Aden. The site has a rich biodiversity. Nowhere else in the world do 37% of Socotra's 825 plants, 90% of its reptiles and 95% of its snails occur. It is home to 192 bird species, 253 species of coral, 730 species of coastal fish, and 300 species of crab and lobster, as well as the Dragon's Blood Tree (Dracaena cinnabari). The cultural heritage of Socotra includes the unique Soqotri language.

See also 

 List of Yemen-related topics
 Outline of Yemen
Index of Yemen-related articles

Notes

References

External links 

 Couto, Diogo do; Observações sobre as principais causas da decadência dos portugueses na Ásia
 Yemen Government Official web site 
 Yemen Government official portal  
 Yemen. The World Factbook. Central Intelligence Agency.
 
 
 Yemen profile from the BBC News
 
 Diogo do Couto, o português da Índia há 500 anos

 
1990 establishments in Yemen
Arabic-speaking countries and territories
Countries in Asia
Islamic republics
Least developed countries
Member states of the Arab League
Member states of the Organisation of Islamic Cooperation
Member states of the United Nations
Middle Eastern countries
Near Eastern countries
States and territories established in 1990
Western Asian countries
Transcontinental countries